Sarah Ditum is an English opinion columnist and freelance writer whose work has appeared in publications including The Guardian, New Statesman, The Times, and UnHerd. She is based in Bath. Ditum's writing has covered issues including violence against women, gender identity, parenting, British parliamentary politics and cancel culture. She also writes regular book reviews. In 2021, Fleet acquired Ditum's book Upskirt Decade: Women, Fame and The Noughties, which is scheduled to be released in 2023.

Controversy 
Ditum has been criticised for her views on transgender issues, which she has expressed on media platforms such as a 2018 televised panel debate hosted as part of the Genderquake season of programming on a Channel 4, appearing alongside Germaine Greer, Munroe Bergdorf and Caitlyn Jenner. In 2019, Ditum authored an article for The Stage expressing her view that The Old Vic's introduction of unisex customer toilets is harmful to women, which was later removed from the publication's website following backlash. Speaking to Press Gazette on the incident, Ditum stated: "The Stage pulled it (and the companion piece) in response to complaints about me, without forewarning me, thereby giving credence to false accusations against me – but more importantly, denying coverage to a fundamental matter of women's access to public space."

Personal life 
Ditum identifies as bisexual. According to a column she wrote in New Statesman, when she married her husband she took his surname "Ditum" to improve her name's SEO.

References 

British opinion journalists
English columnists
Living people
Year of birth missing (living people)